Moss is a virtual reality adventure game developed and published by American video game development studio Polyarc. The game is presented from a blend of first-person and third-person perspectives, with a primary focus on solving puzzles. Moss was released for the PlayStation 4 in February 2018. In June, a PC version featuring high-resolution graphics was released. A PlayStation 5 version was released on February 2023.

A sequel, Moss: Book II, was announced by Polyarc during Sony's State of Play in 2021, and was released on March 31, 2022.

Plot
While in a library, the reader finds an old book. As they flip through pages, the reader is transported to a fantasy land contained within the book. The reader meets Quill, a young mouse, and begins an adventure. The kingdom where Quill lives has been overthrown by Sarffog, a fire-breathing snake. After Quill's uncle is captured, the reader guides Quill on an adventure to defeat Sarffog and save her uncle.

Gameplay
Moss is an adventure game viewed from the first-person perspective using the VR (HTC Vive, Oculus Rift, Oculus Quest, PSVR) headset. The player is shown in the game as a masked face and orb. Unlike most games, Quill is aware of the player. The player controls Quill, navigating environments and battling enemies. The player also can manipulate the environment to navigate obstacles and solve puzzles. Quill communicates with the player through the use of American Sign Language (ASL) for puzzle hints and emotional responses.

The player can change positions to have different perspectives of the world, leaning to see around buildings or standing up and getting an aerial view. There are collectible scrolls that only can be found by changing positions and exploring parts of the world that normally cannot be seen.

On May 21, 2019, a free DLC with additional environments, challenges, storytelling, new puzzles, combat, and weaponry was released.

Reception

According to Metacritic, Moss has received generally favorable reviews. In reviews, both Digital Trends and VentureBeat praised the interaction with Quill and the world design. Both also stated that the game length was on the short side.

In a 2017 article, Mike Fahey of Kotaku noted the positive response to Quill's design and use of sign language.

On August 3, 2018, video game record label Materia Collective released the soundtrack digitally, as well as on compact disc and vinyl.

Accolades

References

External links

2018 video games
Adventure games
Augmented reality in fiction
PlayStation 4 games
PlayStation 4 Pro enhanced games
PlayStation 5 games
PlayStation VR games
PlayStation VR2 games
Oculus Rift games
Meta Quest games
HTC Vive games
Single-player video games
Video games about mice and rats
Video games developed in the United States
Windows games
Unreal Engine games
Valve Index games